Emily Bishop may refer to:

In people
 Emily Clayton Bishop (1883–1912), American sculptor
 Emily Montague Mulkin Bishop (1858–1916), American Delsartean lecturer, instructor, author

In fictional characters
 Emily Bishop, fictional character from the British ITV soap opera Coronation Street